União Recreativa dos Trabalhadores, commonly known as URT, is a Brazilian football club based in Patos de Minas, Minas Gerais state. They competed in the Copa do Brasil three times.

History
The club was founded on July 9, 1939. They won the Taça Minas Gerais in 1999, when they beat Democrata-GV in the final, and in 2000, when they defeated Ipatinga in the final. URT competed in the Copa do Brasil in 2000, when they were eliminated in the First Round by Fluminense, in 2001, when they were eliminated in the First Round by Mixto, and in 2006, when they were eliminated in the First Round by Londrina.

Current squad
As of 26 April 2016.

Achievements
 Taça Minas Gerais:
 Winners (2): 1999, 2000
 Campeonato Mineiro Módulo II:
 Winners: 2013

Stadium
União Recreativa dos Trabalhadores play their home games at Estádio Zama Maciel. The stadium has a maximum capacity of 2,800 people.

References

 
Association football clubs established in 1939
1939 establishments in Brazil